The Smell of Quinces is a 1982 Yugoslav drama film directed by Mirza Idrizović. It was entered into the 13th Moscow International Film Festival. The film was also selected as the Yugoslav entry for the Best Foreign Language Film at the 55th Academy Awards, but was not accepted as a nominee.

Cast
 Mustafa Nadarević as Mustafa
 Ljiljana Blagojević as Luna
 Irfan Mensur as Ibrahim
 Izet Hajdarhodžić as Hamdibeg
 Nada Djurevska as Azra
 Semka Sokolović-Bertok as Esma
 Boro Stjepanović as Alkalaj
 Špela Rozin as Marija
 Branko Đurić as Lt. Storm
 Zijah Sokolović as Huso Mujagin

See also
 List of submissions to the 55th Academy Awards for Best Foreign Language Film
 List of Yugoslav submissions for the Academy Award for Best Foreign Language Film

References

External links
 

1982 films
1982 drama films
Serbo-Croatian-language films
Yugoslav drama films
Films set in Sarajevo
Films about businesspeople